Francis Carr Hudspeth (20 April 1890 – 5 February 1963) was an English footballer, who most notably played as a defender for Newcastle United.

Hudspeth spent nineteen seasons at Newcastle, from 1910 to 1929. This makes him the joint longest servant for the club along with Billy McCracken. During his time at the club he became a popular figure amongst the fans and gained the nickname 'Old Surefoot' for his reliability. He captained the team from 1923 to 1926 but was demoted to vice-captain following Hughie Gallacher's arrival at the club. Hudspeth was also known for his ability to score penalties and 25 of his 37 goals at Newcastle came from the penalty spot.

He is second only to Jimmy Lawrence for making the highest number of appearances for Newcastle, taking part in 472 games. He also represented England at international level.

Personal life
Hudspeth served as an able seaman in the Royal Navy during the First World War.

References

1890 births
1963 deaths
English footballers
Newcastle United F.C. players
England international footballers
England wartime international footballers
Royal Navy personnel of World War I
Association football fullbacks
Sportspeople from North Shields
Footballers from Tyne and Wear
English Football League players
Royal Navy sailors
People from Percy Main
FA Cup Final players